Jeong Jin-hui (born 24 March 1999) is a South Korean handball player who plays as a goal keeper for Korea National Sport University and for South Korea internationally. She made her Olympic debut representing South Korea at the 2020 Summer Olympics.

Career 
She participated at the 2017 World Women's Handball Championship where South Korea finished at 13th place. She was part of the national team which claimed bronze medal during the 2018 Women's Youth World Handball Championship where South Korea defeated Sweden 34–27 in the third place match.

She was included in the South Korean squad in the women's handball competition for the 2020 Summer Olympics.

References

External links
 

1999 births
Living people
South Korean female handball players
Handball players at the 2020 Summer Olympics
Olympic handball players of South Korea